The 1986 Penn State Nittany Lions football team represented the Pennsylvania State University as an independent during the 1986 NCAA Division I-A football season. Led by 21st-year head coach Joe Paterno, the Nittany Lions compiled a record of 12–0. Penn State defeated the Miami Hurricanes, 14–10, in the 1987 Fiesta Bowl to win Paterno's second consensus national championship. The team was named national champion by AP, Billingsley, FB News, FW, Matthews, NCF, NFF, Sporting News, UPI, and USA/CNN, while named co-champion by FACT, Sagarin (ELO-Chess).

Schedule

Rankings

AP Poll

UPI Poll

Game summaries

Temple

Boston College

East Carolina

Rutgers

Cincinnati

Syracuse

#2 Alabama

West Virginia

Maryland

Notre Dame

Pittsburgh

#1 Miami (FL) (Sunkist Fiesta Bowl)

Roster

NFL Draft
Thirteen Nittany Lions were drafted in the 1987 NFL Draft.

Awards
Joe Paterno
Eddie Robinson Coach of the Year
Paul "Bear" Bryant Award

Media

Radio

References

Penn State
Penn State Nittany Lions football seasons
College football national champions
Fiesta Bowl champion seasons
Lambert-Meadowlands Trophy seasons
College football undefeated seasons
Penn State Nittany Lions football